Below is the list of populated places in Zonguldak Province, Turkey by the districts. In the following lists first place in each list is the administrative center of the district.

Zonguldak

Zonguldak
Akşeyh, Zonguldak
Alancık, Zonguldak
Aşağıçayır, Zonguldak
Ayvatlar, Zonguldak
Balçıklı, Zonguldak
Beycuma, Zonguldak
Bozca, Zonguldak
Çağlı, Zonguldak
Çatalağzı, Zonguldak
Çırgan, Zonguldak
Çukurören, Zonguldak
Dağköy, Zonguldak
Dereköy, Zonguldak
Ebegümeci, Zonguldak
Eceler, Zonguldak
Elvanpazarcık, Zonguldak
Enseköy, Zonguldak
Esenköy, Zonguldak
Futa, Zonguldak
Gelik, Zonguldak
Göbü, Zonguldak
Gücek, Zonguldak
Hacıali, Zonguldak
Himmetoğlu, Zonguldak
Kabalaklı, Zonguldak
Kaleoğlu, Zonguldak
Karadere, Zonguldak
Karaman, Zonguldak
Karapınar, Zonguldak
Kardeşler, Zonguldak
Kargalar, Zonguldak
Keller, Zonguldak
Kızılcakese, Zonguldak
Kilimli, Zonguldak
Korucak, Zonguldak
Kozlu, Zonguldak
Kozluköy, Zonguldak
Köroğlu, Zonguldak
Köserecik, Zonguldak
Kumtarla, Zonguldak
Kurtköy, Zonguldak
Muslu, Zonguldak
Olukyanı, Zonguldak
Osmanlı, Zonguldak
Örencik, Zonguldak
Sakaköy, Zonguldak
Sapça, Zonguldak
Saraycık, Zonguldak
Sarımsak, Zonguldak
Seyfetler, Zonguldak
Sivriler, Zonguldak
Sofular, Zonguldak
Şirinköy, Zonguldak
Tasmacı, Zonguldak
Taşçılar, Zonguldak
Türkali, Zonguldak
Uzungüney, Zonguldak
Üçköy, Zonguldak
Yahma, Zonguldak

Alaplı

Alaplı
Ahatlı, Alaplı
Ahiler, Alaplı
Alaplıbölücek, Alaplı
Alaplıkocaali, Alaplı
Alaplıortacı, Alaplı
Alaplıömerli, Alaplı
Alioğlu, Alaplı
Aşağıdağ, Alaplı
Aşağıdoğancılar, Alaplı
Aşağıtekke, Alaplı
Aydınyayla, Alaplı
Bektaşlı, Alaplı
Belen, Alaplı
Büyüktekke, Alaplı
Canbazlı, Alaplı
Çamlıbel, Alaplı
Çatak, Alaplı
Çayköy, Alaplı
Çengelli, Alaplı
Çiçekli, Alaplı
Demirciler, Alaplı
Doğancılar, Alaplı
Durhanlı, Alaplı 
Fındıklı, Alaplı
Gökhasan, Alaplı
Gümeli, Alaplı
Gürpınar, Alaplı
Hacıhasan, Alaplı
Hallı, Alaplı
Hasanlı, Alaplı
Hüseyinli, Alaplı
İsafakılı, Alaplı
Kabalar, Alaplı
Kasımlı, Alaplı
Kılçak, Alaplı
Kıran, Alaplı
Kocaman, Alaplı
Küçükkaymaz, Alaplı
Küçüktekke, Alaplı
Kürkükler, Alaplı
Musabeyli, Alaplı
Okçular, Alaplı
Onurlu, Alaplı
Osmanlı, Alaplı
Sabırlı, Alaplı
Sofullu, Alaplı
Yedigelli, Alaplı
Yenidoğanlar, Alaplı
Yeniköy, Alaplı
Yeşilyurt, Alaplı

Çaycuma

Çaycuma
Ahatlı, Çaycuma
Adaköy, Çaycuma
Akçahatipler, Çaycuma
Akpınar, Çaycuma
Akyamaç, Çaycuma
Aliköy, Çaycuma
Aşağıihsaniye, Çaycuma
Aşağısarmaşık, Çaycuma
Ayvazlar, Çaycuma
Basat, Çaycuma
Başaran, Çaycuma
Burunkaya, Çaycuma
Coburlar, Çaycuma
Çamlık, Çaycuma
Çayır, Çaycuma
Çayköy, Çaycuma
Çomranlı, Çaycuma
Çorak, Çaycuma
Çömlekçi, Çaycuma
Dağüstü, Çaycuma
Derecikören, Çaycuma
Dereköseler, Çaycuma
Dereli, Çaycuma
Dursunlar, Çaycuma
Emirşah, Çaycuma
Erenköy, Çaycuma
Esenlik, Çaycuma
Esentepe, Çaycuma
Esenyurt, Çaycuma
Filyos, Çaycuma
Geriş, Çaycuma
Gökçehatipler, Çaycuma
Gökçeler, Çaycuma
Gökçetabaklar, Çaycuma
Güdüllü, Çaycuma
Güzeloğlu, Çaycuma
Güzelyaka, Çaycuma
Güzelyurt, Çaycuma
Hacıibadi, Çaycuma
Hacılar, Çaycuma
Hacıosmanlar, Çaycuma
Helvacılar, Çaycuma
İhsanoğlu, Çaycuma
Kadıoğlu, Çaycuma
Kahvecioğlu, Çaycuma
Kalafatlı, Çaycuma
Kalaycıoğlu, Çaycuma
Karaahmetler, Çaycuma
Karakoç, Çaycuma
Karamusa, Çaycuma
Karapınar, Çaycuma
Kayabaşı, Çaycuma
Kayıkçılar, Çaycuma
Kerimler, Çaycuma
Kışla, Çaycuma
Kızılbel, Çaycuma
Koramanlar, Çaycuma
Madenler, Çaycuma
Muharremşah, Çaycuma
Muhsinler, Çaycuma
Musausta, Çaycuma
Nebioğlu, Çaycuma
Perşembe, Çaycuma
Ramazanoğlu, Çaycuma
Saltukova, Çaycuma
Sandallar, Çaycuma
Sarmaşık, Çaycuma
Sazköy, Çaycuma
Sipahiler, Çaycuma
Şehler, Çaycuma
Şenköy, Çaycuma
Şeyhoğlu, Çaycuma
Taşçılı, Çaycuma
Temenler, Çaycuma
Torlaklar, Çaycuma
Uluköy, Çaycuma
Veliköy, Çaycuma
Yakademirciler, Çaycuma
Yazıbaşı, Çaycuma
Yazıköy, Çaycuma
Yeniköy, Çaycuma
Yeşilköy, Çaycuma
Yeşilyayla, Çaycuma
Yeşilyurt, Çaycuma
Yolgeçen, Çaycuma
Yukarıdere, Çaycuma
Yukarıgöynük, Çaycuma
Yukarıihsaniye, Çaycuma

Devrek

Devrek
Adatepe, Devrek
Ahmetoğlu, Devrek
Akçabey, Devrek
Akçasu, Devrek
Aksu, Devrek
Alparslan, Devrek
Ataköy, Devrek
Bakırcılar, Devrek
Başlarkadı, Devrek
Bılık, Devrek
Bölücek, Devrek
Burhanoğlu, Devrek
Bükköy, Devrek
Çağlar, Devrek
Çaydeğirmeni, Devrek
Çolakpehlivan, Devrek
Çomaklar, Devrek
Çorak, Devrek
Dedeoğlu, Devrek
Derebulaca, Devrek
Durupınar, Devrek
Eğerci, Devrek
Erenler, Devrek
Ermekoğlu, Devrek
Eveyikli, Devrek
Gümüşpınar, Devrek
Gürbüzler, Devrek
Gürçeşme, Devrek
Güzelyurt, Devrek
Halilbeyoğlu, Devrek
Hatipler, Devrek
Hışıroğlu, Devrek
Hüseyinçavuşoğlu, Devrek
İsabeyli, Devrek
İslamköy, Devrek
Kabaca, Devrek
Karabaşlı, Devrek
Karacaören, Devrek
Karakoçlu, Devrek
Komşular, Devrek
Kozlugüney, Devrek
Kozlukadı, Devrek
Kurudere, Devrek
Kuzca, Devrek
Mahmutoğlu, Devrek
Mekekler, Devrek
Mumcuoğlu, Devrek
Müfettişler, Devrek
Müstakimler, Devrek
Nizamlar, Devrek
Oğuzhan, Devrek
Osmanbeyler, Devrek
Özbağı, Devrek
Özpınar, Devrek
Özyurt, Devrek
Pelitli, Devrek
Pınarönü, Devrek
Purtuloğlu, Devrek
Sabunlar, Devrek
Sarnaz, Devrek
Serdaroğlu, Devrek
Seyisoğlu, Devrek
Sipahiler, Devrek
Sofular, Devrek
Tabaklar, Devrek
Taşkesen, Devrek
Tellioğlu, Devrek
Tosunlar, Devrek
Türkmenoğlu, Devrek
Velibeyler, Devrek
Yağmurca, Devrek
Yassıören, Devrek
Yazıcık, Devrek
Yazıcıoğlu, Devrek
Yeniköy, Devrek
Yeşilada, Devrek
Yeşilköy, Devrek
Yeşilöz, Devrek
Yeşilyurt, Devrek
Yılanlıca, Devrek
Yılanlıcakuz, Devrek

Ereğli

Ereğli
Abdi, Ereğli
Akkaya, Ereğli
Akköy, Ereğli
Alacabük, Ereğli
Alaplısofular, Ereğli
Artıklar, Ereğli
Aşağıhocalar, Ereğli
Aşağıkayalıdere, Ereğli
Aydın, Ereğli
Aydınlar, Ereğli
Ballıca, Ereğli
Başören, Ereğli
Başörendoğancılar, Ereğli
Bayat, Ereğli
Bölücek, Ereğli
Cemaller, Ereğli
Çamlıbel, Ereğli
Çayırlı, Ereğli
Çaylıoğlu, Ereğli
Çevlik, Ereğli
Çiğdemli, Ereğli
Çömlekçi, Ereğli
Dağlar, Ereğli
Dağlıca, Ereğli
Danişmentli, Ereğli
Davutlar, Ereğli
Dedeler, Ereğli
Düzpelit, Ereğli
Elmacı, Ereğli
Emirali, Ereğli
Esenköy, Ereğli
Esenler, Ereğli
Fındıklı, Ereğli
Gebe, Ereğli
Gökçeler, Ereğli
Göktepe, Ereğli
Güllük, Ereğli
Gülüç, Ereğli
Güzelyurt, Ereğli
Hacıuslu, Ereğli
Halaşlı, Ereğli
Hamzafakılı, Ereğli
Hasankahyalar, Ereğli
Hasbeyler, Ereğli
Işıklı, Ereğli
İmranlar, Ereğli
İskenderli, Ereğli
Kandilli, Ereğli
Karakavuz, Ereğli
Kaymaklar, Ereğli
Keşkek, Ereğli
Ketenciler, Ereğli
Kıyıcak, Ereğli
Kızılca, Ereğli
Kızılcapınar, Ereğli
Kirencik, Ereğli
Kocaali, Ereğli
Kurtlar, Ereğli
Külah, Ereğli
Ormanlı, Ereğli (town)
Ormanlı, Ereğli (village)
Ortacı, Ereğli
Ortaköy, Ereğli
Osmanlar, Ereğli
Ova, Ereğli
Öğberler, Ereğli
Ören, Ereğli
Pembeciler, Ereğli
Pınarcık, Ereğli
Ramazanlı, Ereğli
Rüşanlar, Ereğli
Sakallar, Ereğli
Saltuklu, Ereğli
Sarıkaya, Ereğli
Serintepe, Ereğli
Sofular, Ereğli
Soğanlıyörük, Ereğli
Sücüllü, Ereğli
Süleymanbeyler, Ereğli
Sütlüce, Ereğli
Şamlar, Ereğli
Tepeören, Ereğli
Terzi, Ereğli
Topallı, Ereğli
Topçalı, Ereğli
Toyfanlı, Ereğli
Uludağ, Ereğli
Üçköy, Ereğli
Üveyikli, Ereğli
Vakıf, Ereğli
Velidağ, Ereğli
Yalnızçam, Ereğli
Yaraşlıyörük, Ereğli
Yazıcılar, Ereğli
Yazıören, Ereğli
Yenidoğancılar, Ereğli
Yeniköy, Ereğli
Yeşilköy, Ereğli
Yukarıhocalar, Ereğli
Yunuslu, Ereğli
Zındancılar, Ereğli

Gökçebey

Gökçebey
Aktarla, Gökçebey
Aliusta, Gökçebey
Aydınlar, Gökçebey
Bakacakkadı, Gökçebey
Bakiler, Gökçebey
Bodaç, Gökçebey
Çukur, Gökçebey
Dağdemirciler, Gökçebey
Yeşilköy, Gökçebey
Duhancılar, Gökçebey
Gaziler, Gökçebey
Hacımusa, Gökçebey
Karapınar, Gökçebey
Muharremler, Gökçebey
Namazgah, Gökçebey
Örmeci, Gökçebey
Pazarlıoğlu, Gökçebey
Saraçlar, Gökçebey
Uzunahmetler, Gökçebey
Veyisoğlu, Gökçebey

References

List
Zonguldak